Stefan Maletić (born 9 April 1987) is a Serbian footballer who plays for DOVO

Personal life
His family is originally from Zenica in Bosnia and Herzegovina. He is the older brother of Marko Maletić, who is also a footballer.

External links

1987 births
Living people
Footballers from Belgrade
Serbian footballers
Dutch footballers
Serbian emigrants to France
Dutch people of Bosnia and Herzegovina descent
Boldklubben Frem players
TOP Oss players
FK Kozara Gradiška players
NK Čelik Zenica players
FK Radnik Bijeljina players
Stuttgarter Kickers players
3. Liga players
Burton Albion F.C. players
VV DOVO players
Association football central defenders